Benzylpiperidine may refer to any of several chemical compounds:

 1-Benzylpiperidine (N-Benzylpiperidine)
 2-Benzylpiperidine
 3-Benzylpiperidine
 4-Benzylpiperidine